Robert Draba (born April 5, 1970 in Warsaw) is a Polish lawyer and politician.

A graduate of philosophy and sociology, and law schools of University of Warsaw, he worked in Creditanstal Bank before joining public service. He served various positions before entering Presidential office:
 Chief of the legal office in the Fundacja Polsko-Niemieckie pojednanie (1995–1999)
 Deputy of the director of the office of Veteran Affairs (1999–2002)
 Director of the legal office (2002)
 Legal office director of the city of Warsaw (2002–2004)
 Vice President of Warsaw under President Lech Kaczyński (2004–2005)

After Kaczyński became the President of Poland, he joined his staff as deputy chief of office, responsible for legal matters.

After Andrzej Urbański resigned as a Chief of the Office, he became Acting Chief for the first time. He served from June 2 to August 2, 2006, until Aleksander Szczygło was appointed.

He is now serving this position for the second time, after Szczygło stepped down in order to become Minister of Defense. Draba is acting from February 7, 2007.

References

1970 births
Living people
Polish politicians
Lawyers from Warsaw
University of Warsaw alumni